Cuanza may refer to
Cuanza, Angola, commune in Bie province, Angola
Cuanza River, a river in Angola 
Cuanza Norte Province, Angola
Cuanza Sul Province, Angola